4585 Ainonai is a dark Chloris asteroid, approximately  in diameter, located in the central region of the asteroid belt. It was discovered on 16 May 1990, by Japanese amateur astronomers Kin Endate and Kazuro Watanabe at the Kitami Observatory in eastern Hokkaidō, Japan. The presumed carbonaceous C-type asteroid has a longer than average rotation period of 38.3 hours. It was named for the Japanese town of Ainonai, located near the discovering observatory.

Orbit and classification 

When applying the hierarchical clustering method to its proper orbital elements, Ainonai is a core member of the Chloris family, a smaller family of carbonaceous main-belt asteroids, named after its parent body 410 Chloris. It orbits the Sun in the central asteroid belt at a distance of 2.1–3.4 AU once every 4 years and 6 months (1,653 days; semi-major axis of 2.74 AU). Its orbit has an eccentricity of 0.24 and an inclination of 11° with respect to the ecliptic.

Naming 

This minor planet was named after Ainonai, a small Japanese town located near Kitami in eastern Hokkaidō. Asteroids 3785 Kitami and 3720 Hokkaido are named after these two places. The  was published by the Minor Planet Center on 21 November 1991.

Physical characteristics 

Ainonai is an assumed carbonaceous C-type asteroid. This agrees with the overall spectral type of the Chloris family.

Lightcurve 

In June 2008, a rotational lightcurve of Ainonai was obtained from photometric observations by James W. Brinsfield at the Via Capote Observatory  in California. Lightcurve analysis gave a rotation period of  hours with a brightness variation of  magnitude.

Diameter and albedo 

The Collaborative Asteroid Lightcurve Link assumes a standard albedo for a carbonaceous asteroid of 0.057 and calculates a diameter of 14.64 kilometers based on an absolute magnitude of 12.9.

References

External links 
 Asteroid Lightcurve Database (LCDB), query form (info )
 Dictionary of Minor Planet Names, Google books
 Discovery Circumstances: Numbered Minor Planets (1)-(5000) – Minor Planet Center
 
 

004585
Discoveries by Kin Endate
Discoveries by Kazuro Watanabe
Named minor planets
19900516